Conquest, Capture or Siege of Tunis may refer to:
 Siege of Tunis (Mercenary War) (238 BC)
 Eighth Crusade (1270)
 Conquest of Tunis (1534), a conquest by the Ottomans
 Conquest of Tunis (1535), a conquest by Spain and the Holy Roman Empire
Capture of Tunis (1569)
 Conquest of Tunis (1573), a conquest by Spain and the Holy Roman Empire during which John of Austria visited the bay near Ghar el-Melh
 Conquest of Tunis (1574), a conquest by the Ottomans
 Siege of Tunis (1694), a siege by the regency of Algiers
 Capture of Tunis (1735), capture of the city by Algiers 
 Capture of Tunis (1756), capture of the city by Algiers
 Operations Vulcan and Strike, a 1943 conquest by the Allies in World War II

See also
Battle of Tunis (disambiguation)